Muhammad Musthafa is an Indian actor and director who predominantly works in Malayalam film industry. He won special mention for his performance in the film Ain in the 62nd National Film Awards.

Musthafa came into the limelight through the reality show Best Actor on Amrita TV. He has done major roles in films like Paleri Manikyam: Oru Pathirakolapathakathinte Katha and Penpattanam. He hails from Thenjipalam, Kerala.

Filmography

As actor

As director

TV 
Best Actor (Amritha TV) - Reality show
Oru Cilma Kadha  (Amritha TV) - serial
Khali Whalli (Kairali TV) - serial

Awards and nominations

References

External links
 
 

Living people
Indian male film actors
Male actors from Kerala
Male actors in Malayalam cinema
People from Malappuram
Place of birth missing (living people)
Year of birth missing (living people)
Participants in Indian reality television series